Independent Theatre, formerly known as The Independent Theatre Ltd., was an Australian dramatic society founded in 1930 by Dame Doris Fitton in Sydney, Australia. It is also the name given to the building it occupied from 1939 (then known as the Coliseum Theatre), now owned by Wenona School, in North Sydney, cited as Sydney's oldest live theatre venue.

History
The society was named for London's Independent Theatre Society founded by J. T. Grein and was one of several amateur drama groups of high standard which sprang up in Sydney in the 1930s to fill the gap left by the closure of all but two professional theatres (the last spoken-word theatre to close was The Criterion theatre in 1936, leaving only the Tivoli, which ran vaudeville, and the Theatre Royal, which played musicals and ballets). The range of plays essayed was impressive – from classics to avant-garde pieces, from recent West End and Broadway successes (sometimes the Australian premiere) to offerings from local dramatists. The death of Doris Fitton's co-producer Peter Summerton in 1969 put extra strain on her deteriorating health, and with no-one able or willing to fill her shoes, the Independent closed in 1977. 

In the 1990s, in serious disrepair, the theatre, Sydney's oldest, was bought by Rodney Seaborn's Seaborn, Broughton & Walford Foundation, and reopened in 1998.

 the Independent Theatre operates in North Sydney, in the building opened as the Coliseum Theatre in 1939, run by Wenona School.

Venues
Initially, Fitton's company rehearsed and played in St James' Hall. From 1931, most performances were given in The Savoy, a small single-floor cinema on Bligh Street, chiefly on Wednesday and Saturday, movies being shown on other nights. For some productions, the much larger Sydney Conservatorium of Music was hired. It would have made an ideal home for the club, but was not available for regular hire. In 1937 Doris came to an arrangement with the Sydney Players' Club that they would share Savoy Saturday nights: five weeks for The Independent and three for the Players. But after the Players' Club had cancelled their lease of St James' Hall, the management of The Savoy evicted them both in order to become purely a cinema.

It had been intended to move to the much larger Palace Theatre, 255(?) Pitt Street, at the end of 1932 (it had been used throughout August 1931 for a particularly popular production), but that never eventuated. (It became a venue for "minnie" golf instead!)

The new clubrooms upstairs at 175 Pitt Street served as an occasional performance space from September 1938 to September 1939.

In 1938 the company took a two-year lease over the old Criterion (which was originally a cable winding station for the cable trams), at 269 Miller Street, North Sydney (near Ridge Street), which had been made available by the collapse of the Kursaal Theatre Group. For a time they were running two productions in parallel: at Pitt Street and at their new premises, renamed "The Independent"; by September 1939 the move was complete. The building was owned by North Sydney Coliseum Company, who in 1947 made moves to sell the building. Funds were raised for its purchase.

Clubrooms
Clubrooms are used for read-throughs of plays, training and rehearsals other than full dress rehearsals to save the expense of theatre hire. Often they would be made available to other groups and community organizations. They may also be used for storage, maintenance and sometimes even preparation of programmes, scenery, props and costumes. Doris first rented rooms for this purpose in 1933 at 60 King St then moved to 112 King St in early 1934.
and were still there in 1938  when the building was destroyed by fire. They rented the first floor (US second floor) of "Club Chambers" at 175 Pitt St from July 1938 to mid-1939 when they took over the Coliseum and there was no need for a separate facility.

Performances
Doris was usually producer and director, and frequently leading lady, and in each of these roles won  praise from the critics. Dame Sybil Thorndike is recorded as saying of The Independent "It is too good to be judged by the standards of the amateur stage." The list below exemplifies the range and standard of plays performed.

In 1942 The Independent embarked on a joint management arrangement with Alec Coppel's Whitehall Productions which entailed nightly professional presentations, alternating seasons with the Minerva Theatre across the other side of the city. The scheme was abandoned after one month due to poor weekday attendances.

In 1944 they played at the newly opened American Red Cross Club at Kensington.

On 19 September 1944, the building narrowly escaped destruction when the adjacent building, previously the De Luxe Theatre but then used by the Army as a store, caught fire. Newspaper reports of hand grenades and bombs being hastily removed were denied by officials.

Initially amateur, "The Indi" started paying award rates to a nucleus of leading players from May 1955. Those selected included Marie Rosenfeld, Ethel Gabriel, Jessica Noad, Molly Brown, Haydee Seldon, Leonard Bullen, John Carlson and Grenville Spencer. Doris's intended six shows a week was soon cut to three in the face of inadequate rehearsal time.

In 1948 John Alden used "The Independent" as home for his fledgling Shakespeare Company. Other groups to use "The Independent" at various times were the Independent Theatre School of Stagecraft, Heather Gell Productions, Lesley Bowker's Reiby Players and the Liberal Youth Club's Dramatic Group.

Selected productions
Note: This list is incomplete and only dramatic productions by The Independent Theatre are listed. Most are opening nights with no indication of successive performances if any. It includes very few of the many evenings of one-act plays (including finalists of their annual play-writing contests) and matinees. Where no producer is credited, it may be assumed to have been Doris Fitton.

at St James' Hall, Phillip Street
6 Aug 1930 By Candlelight  dir. Harry Tighe
8 Oct 1930 The Marquise
12 Nov 1930 The Queen Was in Her Parlour
at Savoy Theatre, Bligh Street unless otherwise indicated
7 Jan 1931 Michael and Mary
21 Feb 1931 The Silver Cord
21 Mar 1931 And So To Bed
2 May 1931 Hindle Wakes
23 May 1931 By Candle-light
27 Jun 1931 The Constant Nymph (from 8 Aug at Palace Theatre)
12 Sep 1931 The Second Man
21 Nov 1931 Street Scene
5 Dec 1931 The Shadow of the Glen & A Kiss for Cinderella
6 Feb 1932 The Middle Watch by Ian Hay
16 Apr 1932 At Mrs Beam's
23 Apr 1932 Othello
21 May 1932 A Circle of Chalk
4 Jun 1932 The Constant Nymph
2 Jul 1932 The Young Idea
6 Aug 1932 The Great Broxopp
17 Sep 1932 Disraeli
15 Oct 1932 The Merchant of Venice
5 Nov 1932 Mrs. Moonlight
10 Dec 1932 Take Two from One
13 Jan 1933 Peter Pan
14 Jan 1933 The School for Scandal
18 Feb 1933 Caprice
18 Mar 1933 Precious Bane by Mary Webb
13 May 1933 Petticoat Influence
3 Jun 1933 London Wall by John Van Druten
8 Jul 1933 Once in a Lifetime
2 Sep 1933 Musical Chairs
7 Oct 1933 The Ship of Heaven by Hugh McCrae and Alfred Hill – Australian premiere
11 Nov 1933 When Half-Gods Go by Charles Edgbaston and R. J. Fletcher – winner Independent Theatre play writing contest
18 Nov 1933 Strange Orchestra
Peter Pan
3 Feb 1934 Children in Uniform
14 Feb 1934 Hoboes All, The Four Poster, The Missing Jewels, The Fatal Year winners of The Independent's 1933 one-act playwriting contest
17 Mar 1934 Springtime for Henry
14 Feb 1934 Dangerous Corner
26 May 1934 The Marquise prod. George Blackwood
7 Jul 1934 The Fugitive
5 Aug 1934 The Plough and the Stars
31 Aug 1934 The Rose Without a Thorn
18 Sep 1934 Children in Uniform
20 Oct 1934 Alice Sit-by-the-Fire
24 Nov 1934 Counsellor at Law
5 Dec 1934 Cherrie Acres by Sydney writer Dorothea Tobin
12 Dec 1934 Outward Bound
19 Jan 1935 And So To Bed
16 Feb 1935 The Witch (prod. Betty Ward)
16 Mar 1935 Dulcy
24 Apr 1935 Anniversary (by Dymphna Cusack) at the Conservatorium
27 Apr 1935 The Distaff Side
25 May 1935 False Colours (by Frank Harvey) prod. William Rees
22 Jun 1935 The Apple Cart
20 Jul 1935 Squaring the Circle
10 Aug 1935 Richard of Bordeaux
28 Sep 1935 The Improper Duchess
26 Oct 1935 The Late Christopher Bean
11 Jan 1936 Lady Precious Stream
18 Jan 1936 Street Scene
29 Feb 1936 Touch Wood
4 Apr 1936 The Enchanted Cottage
25 Apr 1936 The Dybbuk
13 May 1936 The Man with a Load of Mischief
30 May 1936 Payment Deferred
20 Jun 1936 The Black Eye
25 Jul 1936 The Importance of Being Earnest
5 Aug 1936 The Witch
28 Aug 1936 Companionate Divorce by Sydney writer Mrs Peter Bousfield
5 Sep 1936 The Three Sisters
3 Oct 1936 The Royal Family of Broadway with Jean Innes
31 Oct 1936 Accent on Youth
21 Nov 1936 Awake and Sing
12 Dec 1936 Peter Pan (matinee)
23 Jan 1937 Indoor Fireworks by Arthur McCrae
13 Mar 1937 Hassan
homeless! (various venues)
1 May 1937 Hide-out by Sydney writers Rex Rienits and Stewart Howard (prod. John Alden and Lyn Foster) at King Street
8 May 1937 One-act plays by George Cassidy, Sumner Locke-Elliott, John Alden, Trafford Whitelock at clubrooms, King Street
15 May 1937 The Sybarites by H. Dennis Bradley at clubrooms, King Street
11 Jun 1937 Noah at the Conservatorium of Music
24 Jul 1937 Pride and Prejudice adapted by Helen Jerome at the Conservatorium of Music
14 Aug 1937 Much Ado About Nothing at clubrooms, King Street
11 Sep 1937 Candida at the Conservatorium of Music
30 Sep 1937 There's Always Juliet (prod. Brian Wright) at clubrooms, King Street
2 Oct 1937 Le Malade Imaginaire at clubrooms, King Street
30 Oct 1937 The Cow Jumped Over the Moon (Sumner Locke-Elliott writer and producer) at clubrooms, King Street
13 Nov 1937 Boy Meets Girl at the Conservatorium of Music
24 Nov 1937 No Incense Rising & Remains to Be Proved (winners of Independent play-writing competition) at the Conservatorium of Music
8 Dec 1937 The Play's the Thing at clubrooms, King Street
1 Jan 1937 Peter Pan at Majestic Theatre, Newtown
8 Jan 1938 Mirage by Sydney author Kenneth Wilkinson at clubrooms, King Street
21 Feb 1838 1066 and All That at the Conservatorium of Music
12 Mar 1938 Six Characters in Search of an Author at clubrooms, King Street
2 Apr 1938 Lovers' Leap at clubrooms, King Street
29 Apr 1938 1066 and All That at the Conservatorium of Music
14 May 1938 Judgment Day (prod. Doris Fitton and John Appleton) at the Conservatorium
28 May 1938 The Play's the Thing at clubrooms, King Street
11 Jun 1938 Call It a Day
16 Jul 1938 You Can't Take It with You at clubrooms, King Street
at Independent Theatre Clubrooms, 175 Pitt Street (often called simply Independent Theatre) unless otherwise indicated
13 Aug 1938 Winterset at the Conservatorium of Music
3 Sep 1938 You Can't Take It with You
15 Sep 1938 By Candlelight
21 Sep 1938 The Playboy of the Western World
1 Oct 1938 Housemaster (by Ian Hay) at the Conservatorium of Music
29 Oct 1938 The Guardsman
26 Nov 1938 Time and the Conways  at the Conservatorium of Music
10 Dec 1938 Shadows in the High Place by Sydney writer Laurel Mills
17 Dec 1938 The Folly of It by Sydney writers W. I. Grenville Spencer and Sumner Locke Elliott
7 Jan 1939 The Shadow of a Gunman
7 Jan 1939 You Can't Take It with You at Criterion Theatre
23 Jan 1939 The Guardsman at Criterion Theatre
8 Feb 1939 Housemaster at Criterion Theatre
11 Feb 1939 Tovarich (prod. Betty Ward) at Conservatorium of Music
8 Mar 1939 French Without Tears
18 Mar 1939 The Play's The Thing
1 Apr 1939 Interval by Sumner Locke Elliott
10 May 1939 Baisers Perdus
10 Jun 1939 The Merry Wives of Windsor
3 Jun 1939 1066 and All That at Conservatorium of Music
7 Jun 1939 Baisers Perdus
8 Jul 1939 There Is No Armour (by Lynn Foster of Sydney)
22 Jul 1939 Shall I Go to Tanganyika by A. G. Macdonell (prod. Eric Scott)
5 Aug 1939 Dear Octopus
27 Aug 1939 Daybreak by Tasmanian writer Catherine Shepherd
at Independent Theatre, 269 Miller St, North Sydney
2 Sep 1939 French Without Tears (opening of new theatre)
23 Sep 1939 Molière The Imaginary Invalid
7 Oct 1939 You Can't Take It with You
14 Oct 1939 Once in a Lifetime
4 Nov 1939 The Play's the Thing
25 Nov 1939 Milestones
16 Dec 1939 Alice in Wonderland
6 Jan 1940 Interval (Sumner Locke-Elliott writer and producer)
20 Jan 1940 Anthony and Anna
10 Feb 1940 Our Town (Australian premiere)
23 Mar 1940 Amphitryon 38
13 Apr 1940 The Corn Is Green
18 May 1940 The Little Sheep Run Fast (Sumner Locke Elliott writer and coproducer with Richard Parry)
15 Jun 1940 Biography (Doris Fitton coproduced with Richard Parry)
13 Jul 1940 The Tempest
27 Jul 1940 The Importance of Being Earnest
24 Aug 1940 You Can't Take It With You
31 Aug 1940 Ask No Questions by Gwen Meredith
28 Sep 1940 Penny Wise by Leslie Vyner and Mary Stafford Smith (prod. Richard Parry)
9 Nov 1940 A Man's House
14 Dec 1940 Lady Precious Stream
21 Dec 1940 Painted Sparrows by Guy Paxton and Edward V. Hoile
1 Feb 1941 The Life of the Insects
26 Feb 1941 The Long Christmas Dinner
15 Mar 1941 Thunder Rock
26 Apr 1941 George and Margaret
17 May 1941 The Male Animal
28 Jun 1941 Juno and the Paycock
2 Aug 1941 The House in the Square
13 Sep 1941 A Little Bit of Fluff by Walter W. Ellis (prod. G. F. Hole and O. D. Bisset)
27 Sep 1941 Saint Joan
15 Nov 1941 The Royal Family of Broadway
13 Dec 1941 The Children's Hour
3 Jan 1942 A Kiss for Cinderella
17 Jan 1942 Shout at the Thunder by Gwen Meredith
14 Feb 1942 Penny Wise
28 Feb 1942 Lady in Danger by Max Afford
4 Apr 1942 Press Gang by New Zealand author Margaret Pearson
2 May 1942 Getting Married
under joint management with Whitehall Productions:
6 Jun 1942 Spring Meeting by M. J. Farrell and John Perry (thence to Minerva)
20 Jun 1942 The Importance of Being Earnest (from Minerva)
back to amateur productions:
6 Jul 1942 Dear Brutus
7 Aug 1942 Busman's Holiday by Dorothy L. Sayers
12 Sep 1942 Goodbye to the Music
7 Oct 1942 The Merchant of Venice (season included Monday matinees at Theatre Royal)
17 Oct 1942 Macbeth (season included Monday matinees at Theatre Royal)
6 Nov 1942 The Children's Hour
12 Dec 1942 Toad of Toad Hall
15 Jan 1943 The Seagull
19 Feb 1943 Yellow Sands
19 Mar 1943 Glorious Morning by Norman Macowan
16 Apr 1943 The Marquise by Noël Coward
21 May 1943 The Time of Your Life
18 Jun 1943 Sleep No More by Max Afford
16 Jul 1943 And So to Bed by J. B. Fagan
3 Sep 1943 Stage Door by George S. Kaufman
23 Oct 1943 Hamlet
10 Nov 1943 Tobacco Road (in December this production continued at Minerva for Whitehall Productions)
4 Dec 1943 Your Obedient Servant by Sumner Locke-Elliott
7 Jan 1944 Caprice by Sil-Vara4 Feb 1944 Tobacco Road10 Mar 1944 Dandy Dick14 Apr 1944  in Uniform by Christa Winsloe
12 May 1944 Death Takes a Holiday14 Jul 1944 Oscar Wilde by Leslie and Sewell Stokes
8 Aug 1944 Hay Fever (performed concurrently by Independent students)
28 Sep 1944 The Play's the Thing
26 Oct 1944 Old Acquaintance by John Van Druten
30 Nov 1944 Young Woodley  by John Van Druten
21 Dec 1944 Tonight at 8.30 (three one-act plays by Noël Coward)
28 Dec 1944 The Cherry Orchard
8 Mar 1945 Timeless Moment by Sydney writer Noel Rubie
22 Mar 1945 Death Takes a Holiday
10 Apr 1945 Little Ladyship by Ian Hay
10 May 1945 The Cherry Orchard
22 May 1945 The Doctor's Dilemma (first production of Independent Theatre Professional Repertory Company)
12 Jun 1945 End of Summer by S. N. Behrman
3 Jul 1945 These Positions Vacant by Gwen Meredith (prod. John Alden)
25 Jul 1945 Romeo and Juliet
15 Aug 1945 The Long Mirror by J. B. Priestley
4 Sep 1945 Noah by André Obey
16 Oct 1945 Macbeth
27 Dec 1945 Mourning Becomes Electra prod. Robert Quentin
23 Mar 1946 Whiteoaks prod. John Alden
30 May 1946 The Invisible Circus by Sumner Locke-Elliott, prod. John Carlson
8 Jul 1946 Hamlet prod. Doris Fitton 
23 Oct 1946 A Doll's House by Henrik Ibsen, prod. John Carlson 
1 Dec 1946 Maria Stuart prod. Raoul Cardamatis 
14 Feb 1947 Antigone prod. William Rees 
3 Apr 1947 Volpone adaptation of Ben Jonson's play by Alphons Silbermann, prod. Doris Fitton
5 Sep 1947 Awake My Love by Max Afford
20 Oct 1947 The Little Foxes by Lillian Hellman prod. Robert Quentin 
6 Feb 1948 I Have Been Here Before prod. Laurence H Cecil 
3 July 1948 Jane Clegg
9 Oct 1948 La Marquise prod. Doris Fitton 
6 Oct 1948 The Duchess of Malfi
14 Oct 1948 Rusty Bugles (Sumner Locke-Elliott writer and producer)

(Doris Fitton overseas May 1949 to March 1950; spent much time attempting London production of Rusty Bugles)
12 May 1949 Father Malachy's Miracle prod. James Pratt
19 Mar 1949 Merry Wives of Windsor prod. John Alden 
23 Jun 1949 The Male Animal prod. John Cameron 
The Residuary Legatee
Amphitryon 38
2 Sep 1949 Mandragola prod. Adrian Henry Borzell
28 Oct 1949 Salome prod. Dr. Raoul Cardamatis
9 Nov 1949 A Marriage of Convenience prod. William Rees
14 Jun 1950 Dark of the Moon
Feb 1950?The Sunken Bell prod. Dr. Raoul Cardamatis
6 Apr 1950 The Glencairn Plays: Bound East for Cardiff, In the Zone, The Long Voyage Home, Moon of the Carribees by Eugene O'Neill prod. Lawrence H. Cecil 
6 Sep 1950 Orney Boy
7 Oct 1950 Julius Caesar prod. Lawrence H. Cecil
18 Oct 1950 Home of the Brave
27 Dec 1950 Just For Fun
7 Mar 1951 Anna Lucasta
7 Feb 1952 Ardel
23 Apr 1952 Black Chiffon
15 May 1952 It All Takes Time prod. John Appleton
 Captain Carvallo
 Henry V
26 May 1954 The Cradle Song

Founding members
The first players included Garry Byrne, Marguerite Cullen-Ward, Doris Fitton, Philip Lewis, Dorothy Lowe, Frieda McGhee, Richard Parry, Alathea Siddons and Harry Tighe.

Alumni
Among those associated with Independent Theatre were:

Max Afford
John Alden
John "Jack" Appleton
Franklyn Bennett
Aileen Britton
Barbara Brunton
Leonard Bullen
Albert Collins "Argonauts Club" co-host
John Dease "Quiz Kids" compere
Doris Fitton
William Gates
Hayes Gordon
Patricia Hill
Mary Hosking
James Kemsley
Nellie Lamport
Sumner Locke-Elliott
Hugh McCrae
Gwen Meredith
David Nettheim
Frank O'Donnell
Max Osbiston
Richard Parry
Redmond Phillips
Marie Rosenfeld
Thelma Afford
Charles "Bud" Tingwell
John Wyndham (actor)

Pickwick Theatre Group
Among foundation members of the Independent were Dorise Hill and Phillip Lewis, who in 1931 broke away to form the short-lived Pickwick Theatre Group, associated with the Pickwick Book Club of 156 Pitt Street, Sydney. They held a reception for Sybil Thorndike and Lewis Casson in September 1932, at which members of the Independent Theatre were conspicuously absent.  Early in December 1932 Phillip Lewis took full control of the club then a fortnight later disbanded it. He died in 1950, aged 47. Mrs Albert Cazabon (aka Norah Delaney) and Joy Howarth were notable actors associated with the Pickwick group, whose productions (all at the Savoy Theatre) were:
The Truth Game
Rope
Cynara
The Vortex
Good Morning Bill
Baa, Baa, Black Sheep
The Constant Wife
The Lilies of the Field
Loose Ankles
See Naples and Die
Alibi
Leave It to Psmith.

Sources
History of Australian Theatre - archive
West, John Theatre in Australia Cassell Australia 1978

References

External links
 
 Heritage leaflet
 [CC-By-SA]

Former buildings and structures in Sydney
Theatre companies in Australia
Theatres in Sydney
Theatre in Sydney